William Henry Lambton (1764–1797) was a British member of Parliament (MP) who represented the City of Durham in the House of Commons.

He was the son of Major-General John Lambton, who preceded him as the MP for Durham, and the brother of Ralph John Lambton, who was also an MP for Durham. Lambton was educated at Wandsworth (1773–78), Eton College (1778-82) and Trinity College, Cambridge in 1782.

Lambton was a Freemason, and in 1788 was installed as the first Provincial Grand Master of Durham. The Durham cathedral organist, Thomas Ebdon, composed a march for the occasion.

He inherited the estates of his father in 1794 and engaged the Italian architect Joseph Bonomi the Elder (1739-1808) to build a new house in neo-classical style on the site of Harraton Hall, north of the River Wear. The new house would be called Lambton Hall and the original Lambton Hall on the south side of the river demolished. However, illness would prevent him from seeing the scheme finished.

He died of consumption on 30 November 1797, and was buried in the Old English cemetery in Livorno, Italy. In 1791, Lambton had married Anne Barbara Frances Villiers, the daughter of George Villiers, 4th Earl of Jersey. Their eldest son, John Lambton inherited at the aged of 5 and was later made Earl of Durham . He would finalise the building of Lambton Hall, now expanded in scope and renamed Lambton Castle.

References

1764 births
1797 deaths
People educated at Eton College
Alumni of Trinity College, Cambridge
Members of the Parliament of Great Britain for City of Durham
British MPs 1784–1790
British MPs 1790–1796
British MPs 1796–1800
William
18th-century deaths from tuberculosis
Tuberculosis deaths in Italy
Infectious disease deaths in Tuscany